The Life of the Party is a 1934 British comedy film directed by Ralph Dawson and starring Jerry Verno, Betty Astell and Eric Fawcett. It was made by Warner Brothers as a quota quickie at Teddington Studios.

Plot summary

Cast
 Jerry Verno as Arthur Bleeby  
 Betty Astell as Blanche Hopkins  
 Eric Fawcett as Harry Hopkins  
 Vera Bogetti as Caroline Bleeby  
 Kenneth Kove as Andrew Larkin  
 Hermione Hannen as Dora Reeves  
 Phyllis Morris as Clarice

References

Bibliography
 Low, Rachael. Filmmaking in 1930s Britain. George Allen & Unwin, 1985.
 Wood, Linda. British Films, 1927-1939. British Film Institute, 1986.

External links
 
 
 

1934 films
British comedy films
1934 comedy films
Warner Bros. films
Films shot at Teddington Studios
Quota quickies
British black-and-white films
1930s English-language films
1930s British films
English-language comedy films